Aydan White is an American football cornerback for the NC State Wolfpack.

Early life and high school career 
White was born in Asheville, North Carolina to PJ and Jasman White, his father PJ, was a star wide receiver at Asheville High School. White attended Christ School, a private boarding school in Western North Carolina. White played both receiver and corner in high school, recording 60 catches for over 1,000 yards as a junior but was primarily recruited as a corner. In addition to playing football, White also ran track, winning three state titles in the 110-meter hurdles. A 3 star prospect, he committed to play college football at North Carolina State University over offers from ECU and Wake Forest.

College career 
As a freshman in 2020, White was originally meant to redshirt in order to put additional muscle on his frame but would end up playing following injuries in the teams secondary. In his second game receiving playing time he would record a key interception in the 4th quarter of the Wolfpack's 15–14 win over Liberty and was named the ACC Rookie of the Week.  White would make his first two starts in 2021, but suffered from inconsistent play, and would later call his 2021 campaign "eye opening". Entering the 2022 season, White would miss spring practice with a torn labrum, but would heal prior to the start of the season. White would emerge as a star in 2022, recording 46 tackles and 4 interceptions. On September 18, 2022, he was named the Walter Camp Defensive Player of the Week following a two interception, one pick-six performance against Texas Tech. At the conclusion of the season White was named a member of the All-ACC first team.

References

External links 
 NC State Wolfpack bio

Living people
American football cornerbacks
Players of American football from North Carolina
NC State Wolfpack football players
People from Asheville, North Carolina